Francis Matthews (2 September 1927 – 14 June 2014) was an English actor, best known for playing Paul Temple in the BBC television series of the same name and for voicing Captain Scarlet in Captain Scarlet and the Mysterons.

Early life
Matthews was born in York on 2 September 1927, to Henry and Kathleen Matthews. His father was a shop steward at the Rowntree's chocolate factory near York. His parents took him often to the theatre, where he gained a love of acting. He attended St George's RC Primary School, then St Michael's Jesuit College in Leeds.

He found work as a stagehand at the Theatre Royal in Leeds, and made his theatrical debut in 1945 in the play The Corn Is Green before performing his national service in the Royal Navy. After leaving the military he returned to the stage, appearing in a 1954 touring production of the play No Escape, which starred Flora Robson. He made his West End debut in 1956.

Career

In the 1950s and 1960s, Matthews's film roles for Hammer Studios included the Baron's assistant in The Revenge of Frankenstein (1958) and the heroes of Dracula: Prince of Darkness and Rasputin the Mad Monk (both 1966). On television, from 1969 to 1971, he played Francis Durbridge's amateur private detective Paul Temple in the BBC series of the same name.

Matthews starred opposite Morecambe and Wise in the films The Intelligence Men (1965) and That Riviera Touch (1966), which led to a close friendship with Eric Morecambe. He also appeared throughout the 1960s and 1970s in a variety of television comedy roles, including Eric & Ernie's Christmas Show, 1977. He appeared alongside George Cole in Charles Woods' sitcom Don't Forget To Write! (1977) as a successful writer.

In 1967, Matthews provided the character voice of Captain Scarlet, in imitation of Cary Grant, for Gerry and Sylvia Anderson's Supermarionation television series Captain Scarlet and the Mysterons. (He divided his time, during the recording sessions, between his work there and his stage appearances in Noël Coward's play Private Lives.)

In the late 1970s, he served as narrator and host for Follow Me!, a BBC educational programme that offered a "crash course" in the English language to foreign viewers.
In 1986, Matthews and his wife, Angela Browne, appeared together in the BBC adaptation of the Josephine Tey novel Brat Farrar. In 2000, they starred in two Ray Cooney plays on the cruise ship MS Marco Polo, while she was sailing to the Antarctic: Run For Your Wife and Funny Money.

Personal life
Matthews was married to actress Angela Browne from 1963 until her death in 2001; the couple had three sons. Two, Damien Matthews and Paul Rattigan, are actors; the other, Dominic, is an artist and musician. Matthews' younger brother, Paul Shelley, is also an actor; they had a sister, Maura.

Death
Matthews died at the age of 86 on 14 June 2014, following a short illness. He was survived by his three sons, seven grandchildren, and his two siblings.

Filmography

 At Your Service, Ltd. (1951) - Roger Buckett
 BBC Sunday-Night Theatre (1954–1957, TV Series) - Ken Wilson, Ensign Trefusis
 Truant in Park Lane (1955) - Robert
 St. Ives (1957, TV Series) - Ronald Glichrist
 My Friend Charles (1956) - Ken Palmer
 Bhowani Junction (1956) - Ranjit Kasel
 The Talking Cat (1956) - Lancelot
 ITV Television Playhouse (1956, TV Series) - Richard Hinton, Paul
 Esmé Divided (1957) - Esmé Vignoles
 The New Adventures of Charlie Chan (1957) - Derek Robinson
 Small Hotel (1957) - Alan Pryor
 O.S.S. (1957, TV Series) - Peter Fox
 The Mark of the Hawk (1957) - Overholt
 The Killing Stones (1958) - Desai
 The Adventures of Robin Hood (TV series) (1957–1958, TV Series) - Roland, Ali ben Azra
 The Revenge of Frankenstein (1958) - Doctor Hans Kleve
 A Woman Possessed (1958) - John
 I Only Arsked! (1958) - Mahmoud
 Corridors of Blood (1958) - Jonathan Bolton
 The Vise (1958–1959, TV Series) - Miles, Rex Varney, Jayo
 Theatre Night (1959, TV Series) - Guy Stevens
 Interpol Calling (1960) - Fawley
 Man from Interpol (1960) - Richard Martin, Maharajah Of Den
 Biggles (1960, TV Series)
 Sentenced for Life (1960) - Jim Richards
 The Cheaters (1961, TV Series) - Jack
 The Hellfire Club (1961) - Sir Hugh Manning
 The Treasure of Monte Cristo (1961) - Louis Auclair
 The Pursuers (1961) - David
 Triton (1961, TV series) - Lieutenant Lamb
 The Lamp in Assassin Mews (1962) - Jack
 Nine Hours to Rama (1963) - Rampure
 Hancock (1963, TV series) - Elmo Dent
 A Stitch in Time (1963) - Benson
 A Little Big Business (1964–1965, TV Series) - Simon Lieberman
 The Beauty Jungle (1964) - Taylor
 Murder Ahoy (1964) - Lieutenant Compton
 The Intelligence Men (1965) - Thomas
 Dracula: Prince of Darkness (1966) - Charles Kent
 Rasputin the Mad Monk (1966) - Ivan
 That Riviera Touch (1966) - Hotel manager
 Just Like a Woman (1967) - Lewis McKenzie
 Captain Scarlet and the Mysterons (1967–1968, TV Series) - Captain Scarlet (voice)
 Crossplot (1969) - Ruddock
 Paul Temple (1969–1971, TV Series) - Paul Temple
 Taste of Excitement (1970) - Mr. Breese
 Five Women for the Killer (1974) - Giorgio Pisani
 Brat Farrar (1986) - Alec Loding
 Bunch of Five (1992) - Mr. Strathclyde
 Taggart (1993) - Dr. Gerald Napier
 The Detectives (1995, TV Series) - Duke of Connemara
 Jonathan Creek (1998, TV Series) - Jerry Bellinitus
 Do Not Disturb (1999) - Manager
 Heartbeat (2002–2003, TV Series) - Dr. James Alway
 The Royal (2003) - Dr. James Alway
 Cary Comes Home (2004) - Cary Grant
 All About George (2005) - Ted
 Beautiful People (2009, TV Series) - Mr. Bunions
 Run For Your Wife (2012) - (final film role)

References

External links

1927 births
2014 deaths
20th-century English male actors
21st-century English male actors
English male film actors
English male stage actors
English male television actors
English male voice actors
Male actors from Leeds
Male actors from York
20th-century Royal Navy personnel
People educated at Mount St Mary's Catholic High School, Leeds